List of people that, at different times, have been members of the Situationist International:

Algerian Section 

Hadj Mohamed Dahou
Abdelhafid Khatib

American Section 

Robert Chasse
Bruce Elwell
Jan Horelick
Tony Verlaan

Belgian Section 

Walter Korun
Attila Kotányi
Rudi Renson
Jan Strijbosch
Raoul Vaneigem
Maurice Wyckaert

Dutch Section 

Anton Alberts
Armando
Constant
Jacqueline de Jong
Har Oudejans

English Section 

Timothy (T. J.) Clark
Chris Gray (1942–2009)
Donald Nicholson-Smith
Charles Radcliffe
Ralph Rumney (1934–2002)

French Section 

Francois de Beaulieu
Michele Bernstein
Patrick Cheval
Alain Chevalier
Guy Debord (1931 - 1994)
Edith Frey
Theo Frey
Jean Garnault
Anton Hartstein
Herbert Holl
Mustapha Khayati
Ndjangani Lungela
Rene Riesel
Christian Sebastiani
Patrick Straram
René Viénet

German Section

The SPUR Group

Erwin Eisch
Heinz Hofl
Renee Nele
Gretel Stadler

Excluded in February 1962
Lothar Fischer
Dieter Kunzelmann
Heimrad Prem
Helmut Sturm
Hans-Peter Zimmer

Not excluded in February 1962
Uwe Lausen

Non Spur members
Hans Platschek

Italian Section

Giors Melanotte
Walter Olmo
Claudio Pavan
Giuseppe Pinot-Gallizio
Eduardo Rothe
Paolo Salvadori
Gianfranco Sanguinetti
Piero Simondo
Elena Verrone
Glauco Wuerich

Scandinavian Section

Ansgar Elde
Asger Jorn (1914–1973)
Stefan Larsson
Peter Laugesen
Katja Lindell
Jeppesen Victor Martin
Jørgen Nash
Hardy Strid

No Section

Ivan Chtcheglov
Andre Frankin
Jacques Ovadia
Alexander Trocchi

References

Situationists
Situationist International